Olean is an unincorporated community in Valley County, Nebraska, in the United States.

History
Olean was a request stop on the railroad.

References

Unincorporated communities in Valley County, Nebraska
Unincorporated communities in Nebraska